Kwinana Beach is an outer southwestern suburb of Perth, Western Australia, located within the City of Kwinana. It is one of the traditional industrial suburbs in the Perth metropolitan region.

History
Kwinana is originally a local indigenous Australian word meaning either "young woman" or "pretty maiden". The ship  was wrecked on Cockburn Sound in 1922, and blown on to the beach. The nearby area acquired the name Kwinana Beach when the local postmistress, Clara Wells, immediately started labeling the mail sacks "Kwinana Wreck", to distinguish the settlement there from Rockingham, to the south. Kwinana Beach was officially adopted as a township in 1937.

With the new industrial developments at Kwinana Beach in the 1950s, led by BP's Kwinana Refinery, a large new workers settlement – Kwinana Townsite – was purpose-built slightly inland.  

Other industries quickly followed – Alcoa, CSBP, CBH, Coogee Chemicals, and others. 

The original village at Kwinana Beach was rezoned 'industrial', and scheduled for resumption and compulsory purchase as early as 1953 – apparently unbeknown to the residents. Confirmed in the Stephenson Plan (1955), this was ratified by State Parliament in the 1963 Perth Metropolitan Region Scheme. However, building applications were still being approved throughout the 1960s, and beyond – with a vague warning that the land was earmarked for "potential industrial development". 

There was no real public comment until 1968, following increased pollution, nuisance, and health problems from the growing industrial development just north of the village. This led to a rather lively Council meeting at the Kwinana Beach Hall in September, 1969. The dangers of property resumption were played down by the Kwinana Mayor, Cr. F. Baker, who advised residents to stay put and see what happened. The Air Pollution consultant, Mr A. Keil, informed them that, though there were no immediate plans to use the land for industry, it was a definite possibility – and pollution problems were "unavoidable", and would only get worse.  Residents responded that they didn't mind moving, so long as the compensation was fair, and enabled them to purchase a property of at least equal value – rather than leaving them in debt. 
Finally, a committee was formed to look into the issues.

Matters remained in limbo throughout the 1970s, with residents accepting resumption of their properties as conditions became increasingly intolerable. 

With the exception of the huge CBH grain silos and jetty, very little of this land was ever actually used by industry. Today, rail lines connect local industries to their supplies, snaking through the ruins of the houses and gardens which line the original Kwinana Beach Road. To the north of the Kwinana Beach area, enormous jetties jut out into the deep-water harbour of Cockburn Sound. 

Starting with the Kwinana wreck at Wells Park (named for the postmistress, Clara Wells, who inadvertently named the area in 1922), the Kwinana Beach coastline down to Rockingham is now largely used as beach and recreation areas. The Kwinana wreck itself is now an unrecognisable, short concreted line-fishing jetty.

Motorsport
Kwinana Beach is home to the Perth Motorplex which incorporates an international standard drag racing strip, and a  dirt track speedway. The Motorplex opened in 2000, replacing the old Ravenswood Raceway Drag Racing strip (1969–1999), and the Claremont Speedway which had operated from 1927 until 2000 and is recognised as the longest running speedway in Australia.

Notes

References

External links

 
Suburbs of Perth, Western Australia
Suburbs in the City of Kwinana